Child Psychiatry & Human Development is a bimonthly peer-reviewed scientific journal covering developmental psychology and child psychiatry. It was established in 1970 and is published by Springer Science+Business Media. The editor-in-chief is Eric A. Storch (Baylor College of Medicine). According to the Journal Citation Reports, the journal has a 2020 impact factor of 2.350.

References

External links

Child and adolescent psychiatry journals
Developmental psychology journals
Springer Science+Business Media academic journals
Publications established in 1970
English-language journals
Bimonthly journals